Luis Costa Juan (born 19 February 1943) is a Spanish former football forward and manager.

Most of his professional career was closely associated with Zaragoza, as both a player and a manager.

Playing career
Costa was born in Alicante, Valencian Community. After rising to prominence in amateur tournaments held in his hometown, he signed with Real Madrid from Hércules CF at the age of 17, spending four years under contract with the club as a senior but never appearing in competitive matches – whose forward line included the likes of Francisco Gento, Raymond Kopa, Ferenc Puskás, Luis del Sol and Alfredo Di Stéfano – also being loaned four times to three teams, including fellow La Liga sides Córdoba CF and Elche CF.

In 1966, Costa left the Merengues and signed for Córdoba on a permanent basis, after an unassuming spell with Hércules in Segunda División. From 1968 to 1971 he suffered three consecutive top flight relegations, with the Andalusians, RCD Mallorca and Real Zaragoza; he amassed top level totals of 188 games and 18 goals, and closed out his career at 33 after three years in Tercera División with Girona FC, having obtained his coaching license before he retired.

Coaching career
Costa's first job in the top level came with Zaragoza, which he coached in one game in the 1980–81 season, a 1–1 home draw against Hércules. After two complete seasons in Segunda División, with Palencia CF and Real Oviedo, he returned to the Aragonese for 1985–86, winning his first Copa del Rey – 1–0 win over FC Barcelona – and being fired early into the 1987–88 campaign.

In the early 90s, Costa worked in the lower leagues with Levante UD, Deportivo Alavés and former club Córdoba. In 1994, he was appointed at Zaragoza's reserves in Segunda División B, which he had already coached in the previous decade.

Costa was one of four managers in Zaragoza's first team in the 1996–97 season, with the team finally ranking in 14th position. He was in charge for the entirety of the following campaign, which finished with the club one position above.

Having replaced Juan Manuel Lillo after the fourth round in 2000–01, Costa led Zaragoza to another Spanish Cup conquest, now against RC Celta de Vigo. The team could finish 17th in the league however, being the first above the relegation zone (one of the few bright spots of the campaign was a 4–4 draw at Barcelona).

On 22 January 2002, Costa replaced Txetxu Rojo at the helm of Zaragoza, not being able however to prevent top division relegation (as last) after winning only twice in his ten games in charge.

Honours

Manager
Zaragoza
Copa del Rey: 1985–86, 2000–01

References

External links

1943 births
Living people
Footballers from Alicante
Spanish footballers
Association football forwards
La Liga players
Segunda División players
Tercera División players
Real Madrid CF players
Elche CF players
Córdoba CF players
Hércules CF players
RCD Mallorca players
Real Zaragoza players
Girona FC players
Spain youth international footballers
Spanish football managers
La Liga managers
Segunda División managers
Segunda División B managers
RCD Mallorca managers
SD Huesca managers
Real Zaragoza managers
Girona FC managers
Real Oviedo managers
CD Málaga managers
Elche CF managers
Levante UD managers
Deportivo Alavés managers
Córdoba CF managers
Palencia CF managers